VCW may stand for:

 Vermont Commission on Women
 VCW Cavendish,  9th Duke of Devonshire